Santosham ( Happiness) is a 2002 Indian Telugu-language comedy drama film directed by Dasaradh who co-wrote the film with Gopimohan and Trivikram Srinivas. It stars Nagarjuna Akkineni, Prabhu Deva, Gracy Singh (her Telugu debut) and Shriya Saran. The music was composed by R. P. Patnaik. The film won two Nandi Awards and two Filmfare Awards South. 

Released on 9 May 2002, the film was well received by critics and was declared a Blockbuster at the box office. It became the highest grossing film in Nagarjuna's career and was one of the highest grossing films of the year. It was a welcome break for Nagarjuna from consecutive flops he suffered since 2000. It was dubbed in Tamil as Santhosha Vanille and in Hindi as Pehli Naazar ka Pehla Pyaar. The film was remade in Bengali as Bandhan (2004) and in Kannada as Ugadi (2007).

Plot
Karthik is a rich architect in Ooty. He falls in love with Padmavathi "Padhu". Padhu is hesitant to accept and reciprocate Karthik's love, as she doesn't know what kind of a person he is. Padmavathi has a younger cousin named Bhanu. Bhanu encourages their love and gives courage to Padhu's feelings. When Padhu reveals her love, her father Ramachandrayya enraged, resists and asks her to marry the guy he has chosen for her, causing Padhu to elope and marry Karthik.

Padmavathi is very eager to get back to her parents and get their blessings. Karthik and Padmavathi migrate to New Zealand and they give birth to a kid named Lucky. Padhu, unfortunately, dies in an accident. Ramachandrayya has a very big joint family. A few of the family members opine that inviting Karthik and his kid for a marriage to happen at their place would allow getting a closer look at Lucky. 

When Karthik visits Ramachandrayya's place he gets mixed responses from different people in the house. Ramachandrayya doesn't like Karthik and others like him. Over some time, Karthik impresses them all and when he was about to go back to New Zealand, Ramachandrayya expresses his repentance for whatever happened and says that he is accepting Karthik as his son-in-law.

Bhanu has fallen in love with Karthik. She meets Karthik, a widower now. She still has feelings for him. But at the same time, there is Pawan - a childhood friend of Bhanu - who is deeply in love with her. Karthik returns to New Zealand. Bhanu along with Pawan visits Karthik. During that period, Bhanu gets closer to Karthik. When Karthik realizes her intentions for Bhanu, he fixes Pawan as her fiancée for her. Now Bhanu is about to marry Pawan.

Bhanu loves Karthik, but Karthik hesitates to repeat the history by marrying a girl against the wishes of her family. Just as Karthik is about to leave for good with his son, Ramachandrayya stops him from leaving and pleads with him to marry Bhanu. Also, Pawan comes and pleads with Karthik to marry Bhanu as he can tell that Bhanu is not happy about the marriage. The film has a happy ending with Karthik and Bhanu marrying.

Cast

 Nagarjuna Akkineni as Karthik
 Prabhu Deva as Pavan
 Gracy Singh as Padmavathi / Paddu, Karthik's wife
 Shriya Saran as Bhanu
 K. Viswanath as Ramachandrayya, Paddu’s father
 Kota Srinivasa Rao as Himsaraju / Vikram
 Brahmanandam as Giri from Mangalagiri
 Sunil as Kranthi Kumar / Seetayya
 Chandra Mohan as Chandram
 Paruchuri Venkateswara Rao as Venkat Rao, Bhanu’s father
 Pruthvi as Sriram, Karthik’s brother-in-law
 Banerjee as Suri
 Ahuti Prasad as Prasad, Paddu’s brother
 Preeti Nigam as Rani, Prasad’s wife
 Sumitra as Lakshmi, Paddu’s mother
 Sudha as Savitri, Bhanu’s mother
 Tanikella Bharani
 Melkote
 L. B. Sriram, Paddu’s grandfather
 Vajja Venkata Giridhar as Wedding groom
 Madhu Mani as Malika
 Indu Anand
 Anitha Chowdary as Anitha, Karthik’s sister
 Lahari as Durga
 Aajaam
 Swapna
 Devisri
 Saraswatamma
 Master Akshay as Lucky, Karthik and Paddu’s son
 Sophiya Haque as in item song

Soundtrack

The music was composed by R. P. Patnaik. The music was released on SUPREME Music Company.

Awards
Nandi Awards - 2002
 Best Actor  - Akkineni Nagarjuna
 Third Best Feature Film - Bronze - K. L. Narayana

Filmfare Awards South
 Best Film - Telugu - K. L. Narayana
 Best Music Director - Telugu - R. P. Patnaik

References

External links
 

2002 films
Telugu films remade in other languages
2002 romantic comedy-drama films
Indian romantic comedy-drama films
Films scored by R. P. Patnaik
2000s Telugu-language films
Films shot in Ooty
Films set in New Zealand
Films shot in New Zealand
Indian family films
2002 directorial debut films